Robert S. Bigelow (December 26, 1953 – August 18, 2020) was an American basketball player in the National Basketball Association (NBA). A forward born in Boston, Massachusetts, he played college basketball at the University of Pennsylvania under Hall-of-Fame coach Chuck Daly. He played for the Boston Celtics and San Diego Clippers after playing for the Kansas City Kings for 3 seasons.

He was a published author, having written the 2001 book Just Let the Kids Play and the 2016 e-book Youth Sports: Still Failing Our Kids – How to Really Fix It. In addition, Bob Bigelow was a prolific speaker to communities, and at major conferences, advocating for improving youth sports via better coach education and playing models for children. During his 30-plus year career, he gave over 2,500 talks and coaches clinics to communities throughout the United States, and internationally. He was also selected as one of the “100 Most Influential Sports Educators” by the Institute for International Sport at the University of Rhode Island.

Bigelow died on August 18, 2020.

References

1953 births
2020 deaths
American men's basketball players
Basketball players from Massachusetts
Boston Celtics players
Kansas City Kings draft picks
Kansas City Kings players
Penn Quakers men's basketball players
People from Winchester, Massachusetts
Power forwards (basketball)
San Diego Clippers players
Small forwards
Sportspeople from Middlesex County, Massachusetts